Aramm is a 2017 Indian Tamil-language political drama film written and directed by Gopi Nainar. It features Nayanthara as a district collector, with Ramachandran Durairaj and Sunu Lakshmi in supporting roles. Featuring music composed by Ghibran and cinematography by Om Prakash, the film began production in mid-2016 and had a theatrical release on 10 November 2017. Post-release, the film won appreciation from film critics and performed well commercially.

Plot
The story begins with District Collector Madhivadhani (Nayanthara), who is struggling with her approval to a higher official (Kitty) and telling a bone-chilling story to him.

A week ago, in Kattoor village, poor people are seen fighting with the police for clean water, sanitation, and the verdict to arrest their cruel landlord. Two boys are seen playing in a river, as their family drags them out and scolds them for going and playing there. The next day, a woman named Sumathi (Sunu Lakshmi) and her 4-year-old daughter Dhanshika (Mahalakshmi) are walking together back home. Sumathi soon learns that Dhanshika went missing and enquires the villagers, who tell her that her daughter fell into a borewell. Sumathi rushes there and faints. The villagers call the police, who in turn alerts Madhivadhani. Madhivadhani and her team rush there to assess the situation but are stopped because there is a deep ditch in the middle of the road, which delays their arrival at the site. Madhivadhani and her team finally arrive but are battered by the journalists and the news media, who criticize Madhivadhani over her late arrival and the negligence of the landlord over the open borewell.

Soon, a camp is set up. Sumathi, her husband Pulenthiran (Ramachandran Durairaj), and her son still await Dhanshika's escape. The police sends down a camera and microphone system so that Madhivadhani can talk with Dhanshika in the borewell. Madhivadhani notices that Dhanshika is not receiving enough oxygen, but the doctors ensure that Dhanshika has enough time to survive. The villagers meanwhile try to rescue Dhanshika on their own but fail every time. The police decides to carry out the "butterfly knot" as they demonstrate to Madhivadhani on a dummy. Madhivadhani alerts the medical team about the consequence of the process that Dhanshika's shoulder might get dislocated, but gives the approval to carry out the process. As the police reach out to Dhanshika with the knot, Dhanshika tries to hold on to the knot, but her arm hurts and she falls back into the borewell. Madhivadhani and the family are distraught over this.

The villagers, angry over the long time taken to rescue Dhanshika and the landlord's negligence, attack the police with stones. Madhivadhani then settles the doubt by telling the villagers that the landlord will get arrested and the child will be rescued. Coincidentally, the landlord gets arrested. Madhivadhani then calls for Captain Maharajan and his team from the Indian Defence Army. Maharajan has an idea: to dig out another horizontal tunnel to get Dhanshika out. Madhivadhani approves it. As Maharajan's team is digging the ground, a crack appears in the ground, which causes all the work to stop immediately. As the day darkens into night, the camera suddenly stops working. As the camera gets fixed, Dhanshika shows no response, which causes Pulenthiran to assume that she is dead. He runs off into the half-dug site as he tries to rescue Dhanshika on his own, thus causing another chaos between the villagers and the police while someone alerts the villagers that Dhanshika is still alive. The family decides to send Muthu (Ramesh Thilaganathan), Dhanshika's brother, to rescue her, which Madhivadhani reluctantly approves. Finally, Dhanshika is rescued alive. Pulenthiran, Sumathi, Muthu, and Dhanshika thank Madhivadhani. Madhivadhani sends Dhanshika to the hospital but emotionally breaks down.

Back in the present, Madhivadhani competes with the higher official and resigns from her post as a district collector. She then decides that she will do something for her people as an ordinary person. The film then ends with a timeline slideshow of incidents of children falling in neglected borewells.

Cast

Nayanthara as Madhivadhani IAS (Voiced by Deepa Venkat)
Ramachandran Durairaj as Pulenthiran
Sunu Lakshmi as Sumathi
Mahalakshmi as Dhanshika
Kitty as Government Official
Vela Ramamoorthy as MLA
E. Ramdoss as Police Officer
Jeeva Ravi as Doctor
T. Siva as Minister
Vignesh as Saravanan
Ramesh as Muthu
Vinodhini Vaidyanathan as Nurse

Production
In July 2016, it was reported that actress Nayanthara had quietly started and almost finished filming for a project where she would portray as district collector directed by newcomer Minjur Gopi. Gopi had earlier garnered media attention during the release AR Murugadoss's Kaththi (2014), where he claimed that the pair had stolen his stories to make their films. Gopi had narrated the story of Aramm, an episode from the life of a District Collector to many producers but they were reluctant to come forward and make the film. Gopi zeroed in on the Collector's part because he knew the film would be critical of the government machinery, but stated he did not assign a gender to the Collector until Nayanthara accepted to work on the film. Gopi had managed to get access to Nayanthara, after being recommended to her by director Sarkunam. The film was predominantly shot in Chennai and around Appanur near Paramakudi, with Ramesh and Vignesh of Kaaka Muttai, Ramachandran Durairaj and Sunu Lakshmi also portraying pivotal roles, while Om Prakash was assigned as the film's cinematographer. Filming work for the project was finished in early October 2016, with the film still being untitled.

The title and first look poster of the film was revealed on 18 November 2016, coinciding with Nayanthara's birthday. The team actively chose to promote the actress as the main selling point of the film, rather than the other members of the cast. Nayanthara, who usually does not take part in promotions for her film, agreed to promote the film because she felt the film had a relevant social message. Gopi also revealed that the actress was heavily involved during the making of the film and operated like an assistant director. She also prevented Gopi from making any changes to the script to cater to her fan following. During the post-production phase of the film, Ghibran worked with the City of Prague Philharmonic Orchestra to record the background score.

Soundtrack

The film's music was composed by Ghibran, while the audio rights of the film was acquired by Think Music. The album released on 28 July 2017 and featured three tracks.

Release 
Aramm was released on 10 November 2017 across Tamil Nadu and won positive reviews from film critics. The satellite rights of the film were sold to Sun TV.

Reception
Sify's critic wrote Aramm is a "brilliant film that inspires you to wake up and react", adding it was "compelling, moving and quite unlike anything else, you're likely to watch this year". Ananda vikatan gave 60 marks to this film. Reviewer Manoj Kumar of The Indian Express called the film "hard-hitting", adding "while Nayanthara remains in forefront of the action fast developing, the narration does not deviate from its straight path to meet the approval of her star status". Similarly, a critic from The New Indian Express, called it "a powerful film that doesn't flinch from asking tough questions", while the Times of India called it "effective". Film reviewer Sreedhar Pillai of Firstpost wrote Aramm is "a triumph of honest writing", and added "Nayanthara shows why she's called Kollywood's 'Lady Superstar'". The commercial success of the film prompted Gopi Nainar to announce a sequel which would begin in 2018 with Nayanthara reprising the lead role.

Awards

References

External links 
 

2010s political drama films
2010s Tamil-language films
2017 directorial debut films
2017 films
Drama films based on actual events
Films about social issues in India
Films scored by Mohamaad Ghibran
Indian films based on actual events
Indian political drama films